Schizolaena elongata is a tree in the family Sarcolaenaceae. It is endemic to Madagascar.

Description
Its coriaceous leaves are discolorous.

Distribution and habitat
Schizolaena elongata is known only from the eastern regions of Sava, Atsimo-Atsinanana, Vatovavy-Fitovinany, Analanjirofo and Atsinanana. Its habitat is humid coastal forests from sea-level to  altitude.

References

elongata
Endemic flora of Madagascar
Trees of Madagascar
Plants described in 1805